Andreas Raaby Steenberg (born 22 July 1983 in Randers) is a Danish politician, who was a member of the Folketing for the Social Liberal Party. He was elected into parliament at the 2011 Danish general election, and lost his seat in 2022.

Political career
Steenberg was elected into parliament at the 2011 election, where he received 2,341 personal votes. In 2015 he was reelected with 1,971 votes. He was reelected again in 2019 with 4,444	votes. In the 2022 Danish general election, where the Social Liberal Party lost more than half of their seats, Steenberg was not re-elected, losing out to party fellow Katrine Robsøe.

References

External links 
 Biography on the website of the Danish Parliament (Folketinget)

1983 births
Living people
People from Randers
Danish Social Liberal Party politicians
Members of the Folketing 2011–2015
Members of the Folketing 2015–2019
Members of the Folketing 2019–2022